c3d, C3D, or C3d may refer to:

In science and technology
 .C3D, a standard biomechanics file format used to store biomechanics motion capture data.
 C3D, a geometric modeling kernel for geometric model construction and constructed model control
 C3d, a complement protein that is formed from the breakdown of C3b. C3d binds to the CR2 receptor.